Eremophila tetraptera is a flowering plant in the figwort family, Scrophulariaceae and is endemic to Queensland. It is a shrub or small tree with narrow, lance-shaped leaves often crowded on short side branches, red flowers and unusual four-winged fruits resembling those of hop bushes.

Description
The branches and leaves are slightly sticky when young, due to the presence of resin. The leaves are dull green and arranged alternately, scattered along the branches but often also clustered near the ends of short side-branches.

The petal tube is red to reddish-orange on the outside and orange to yellowish inside and the lowest petal lobe has red spots. The outside surface of petal tube and lobes is glabrous but the inner surface is covered with glandular hairs. The 4 stamens extend beyond the end of the petal tube.

Taxonomy
The species was first formally described in 1944 by Cyril Tenison White and the description was published in  Proceedings of the Royal Society of Queensland. The specific epithet (tetraptera) is derived from the Ancient Greek τέτταρες (téttares) meaning "four" and πτερόν (pterón) meaning “wing" or "feather”, referring to the fruit.

Distribution and habitat
This eremophila grows in small, scattered populations on slopes and along drainage channels in powdery clay soils, often near limestone hills. It occurs in the Diamantina River region and some of the populations occur in the Diamantina National Park.

Conservation
Eremophila tetraptera was classified as "Vulnerable" (VU) under the Australian Government Environment Protection and Biodiversity Conservation Act 1999 (EPBC Act) but was removed from the list in 2013. It is classified as "vulnerable" under the Queensland Nature Conservation Act (1992).

Use in horticulture
Although this shrub is drought resistant, if supplied with adequate water will produce a massed display of reddish-orange flowers. It attracts nectar-feeding birds and its red, four-winged fruit are an added attraction. It can be propagated from cuttings and the shrub grows well in a range of soil types in full sun or partial shade. It only needs an occasional watering during a long drought and usually is only slightly damaged by frost.

References

tetraptera
Flora of Queensland
Plants described in 1944
Taxa named by Cyril Tenison White